Quatá is a municipality in the state of São Paulo in Brazil.

References

External links 
  City Hall official website
  Website about Quatá

Municipalities in São Paulo (state)